Nuk (also Romanized as Nūk) is a village in Dastgerdan Rural District, Dastgerdan District, Tabas County, South Khorasan Province, Iran. At the 2006 census, its population was 161, in 43 families.

References 

Populated places in Tabas County